Falaver-e Bala (also Romanized as Falāver-e Bālā) is a village in Baqerabad Rural District, in the Central District of Mahallat County, Markazi Province, Iran. At the 2006 census, its population was 19, in 4 families.

References 

Populated places in Mahallat County